William Jasper East (September 1, 1854 - 1933) was a longtime Democratic Mississippi state legislator from Tate County in the late 19th and early 20th centuries.

Early life 
William Jasper East was born on September 1, 1854, in Monroe County, Mississippi. He was the eldest child of Josiah Robertson East and Matilda (Callahan) East. William attended the public schools of Panola County. He entered the University of Mississippi in 1879 and graduated from there with a L. L. B. in 1881. He then studied law, and was admitted to the bar in 1883. He then went to practice law in Senatobia.

Political career 
He was the mayor of Senatobia, Mississippi, from 1887 to 1888. He then was a member of the Mississippi State Senate, representing the state's 36th district which was composed of Union, Tippah, Benton, Marshall, and Tate counties, from 1892 to 1896. From 1896 to 1900, he was a member of the Mississippi House of Representatives for Tate County. He was a presidential elector in the 1900 presidential election. After being re-elected in 1903, he was again a member of the Mississippi House for Tate County from 1904 to 1908. From 1908 to 1912, he was again a member of the Mississippi State Senate for the 36th district. He served in the Mississippi House of Representatives for Tate County a final time from 1916 to 1920. He was again a member of the Mississippi Senate for the 36th district from 1920 to 1924. He then served in the same position from 1928 to 1932. East died in Mississippi in 1933.

Personal life 
East was an Episcopalian. He was a member of the Phi Kappa Psi (ΦΚΨ) fraternity. East married Lula Whitten in 1892. They had three children, Whitten, Fletcher, and Lula.

References 

1854 births
1933 deaths
Democratic Party Mississippi state senators
Democratic Party members of the Mississippi House of Representatives
Mississippi lawyers